The 2000 Women's Rugby League World Cup – or Women's World Series – was the first staging of the Women's Rugby League World Cup. The tournament was held in England from early November, culminating in the final between Great Britain and New Zealand on 24 November at Wilderspool Stadium, Warrington. Three teams took part, with Australia missing the final.

Teams

Pool matches

Play-Off Matches

Final

See also

References

2000 Rugby League World Cup
Women's Rugby League World Cup
Women's rugby league in England
World